The 1989 European Aquatics Championships were held from 15 to 20 August 1989 in Bonn, West Germany.

Medal table

Swimming

Men's events

Women's events

Diving

Men's events

Women's events

Synchronized swimming

Water polo

External links
Swimming results

European Aquatics Championships, 1989
LEN European Aquatics Championships
European Aquatics
European Aquatics
European Aquatics
European Aquatics
European Aquatics
20th century in Bonn
1980s in North Rhine-Westphalia